Fez V: Wizard's Betrayal is an adventure for fantasy role-playing games published by Mayfair Games in 1987.

Contents
Fez V: Wizard's Betrayal is a scenario for character levels 4-8 mixing technology and magic.  The adventurers' spaceship crashes on a plateau inhabited by dwarves, orcs, et al.  To escape (and save the world), they must free Fez from the alien spaceship where he is held captive.

Publication history
Fez V: Wizard's Betrayal was written by James Robert and Len Bland, with a cover by Boris Vallejo, and was published by Mayfair Games in 1987 as a 32-page book.

Reception

References

Fantasy role-playing game adventures
Role Aids
Role-playing game supplements introduced in 1987